The chinstrap penguin (Pygoscelis antarcticus) is a species of penguin that inhabits a variety of islands and shores in the Southern Pacific and the Antarctic Oceans. Its name stems from the narrow black band under its head, which makes it appear as if it were wearing a black helmet, making it easy to identify. Other common names include ringed penguin, bearded penguin, and stonecracker penguin, due to its loud, harsh call.

Taxonomy 
This species was originally given the scientific name Aptenodytes antarctica by Johann Reinhold Forster in 1781, thereby placing it in the same genus as the king and emperor penguins. In 1990, Graham Turbott transferred this species into the genus Pygoscelis, together with the Adélie and gentoo penguins. This gave it the new name P. antarctica. However, this is an orthographic error due to the disagreement in Latin grammar between antarctica and its assigned genus. The corrected form, P. antarcticus, is the currently accepted name for this species.

Description 

Males are greater in weight and height than females.

The adult chinstrap's flippers are black with a white edge; the inner sides of the flippers are white. The face is white extending behind the eyes, which are reddish brown; the chin and throat are white, as well, while the short bill is black. The strong legs and the webbed feet are pink. Its short, stumpy legs give it a distinct waddle when it walks. The chinstrap penguin's black back and white underside provide camouflage in the form of countershading when viewed from above or below, helping to avoid detection by its predators.

Distribution 
Chinstrap penguins have a circumpolar distribution. They breed in Antarctica, Argentina, Bouvet Island, Chile, the Falkland Islands, the French Southern Territories, and South Georgia and the South Sandwich Islands. Vagrant individuals have been found in New Zealand, the islands of Saint Helena and Tristan da Cunha, and South Africa.

Ecology 
The chinstrap penguin's tightly packed feathers provide a waterproof coat, enabling it to swim in freezing waters. Additionally, thick blubber deposits and intricate blood vessels in the flippers and legs assist in the preservation of heat.

The main predator of the chinstrap penguin at sea is the leopard seal (Hydrurga leptonyx). Every year, the leopard seal causes the chinstraps population to decrease by about 5% to 20%. On land, the brown skua (Stercorarius antarcticus), south polar skua (Stercorarius maccormicki), and southern giant petrel (Macronectes giganteus) are the primary predators of the penguin. These three species most often prey on eggs and young chinstrap penguins. The Antarctic fur seal is also known to occasionally kill chinstrap penguins.

Behaviour 

On land, they build circular nests from stones, and lay two eggs, which are incubated by both the male and the female for shifts  around 6 days each. The chicks hatch after around 37 days, and have fluffy grey backs and white fronts. The chicks stay in the nest for 20–30 days before they go to join other chicks in a crèche. Around 50–60 days old, they moult, gaining their adult feathers and go to sea.

Chinstrap penguins are generally considered to be the most aggressive and ill-tempered species of penguin.

Roy and Silo 

In 2004, two male chinstrap penguins named Roy and Silo in Central Park Zoo, New York City, formed a pair bond and took turns trying to "hatch" a rock, for which a keeper eventually substituted a fertile egg, and the pair subsequently hatched and raised the chick. Penguins by nature hatch eggs and are social creatures. The children's book And Tango Makes Three was written based on this event.

Conservation status 
In 2018, the IUCN estimated that the population of chinstrap penguins was around 8 million specimens. Although it is believed to be decreasing overall, its population is not severely fragmented and in many sites it is increasing or stable. The species is classified as least concern on the IUCN Red List as of 2016, due to its large range and population, following five previous assessments of the same status from 2004 to 2012 and three assessments as "unknown" from 1988 to 2000.

The chinstrap penguin is primarily threatened by climate change. In several parts of its range, climate change decreases the abundance of krill, which likely makes reproduction less successful. For instance, a 2019 expedition to breeding grounds on Elephant Island show a fifty percent population decline in just under fifty years. Other potential threats include volcanic events and the fishing of krill by humans.

References

External links

 70south.com: information on chinstrap penguins
 Chinstrap penguin images
 Penguin World: chinstrap penguins
 Animals and Earth – photos for conservation, science, education and you – chinstrap penguin photos

Chinstrap
Chinstrap penguin
Birds of Antarctica
Birds of the Southern Ocean
Birds of islands of the Atlantic Ocean
Birds of subantarctic islands
Chinstrap penguin
Articles containing video clips